Joshua Glynn Craddock (born 5 March 1991) is a footballer, who plays for Rushall Olympic.

Career 
Craddock started his senior career in the Football League for Walsall. He made his debut on 3 May 2008 as a substitute in the Football League One clash with Hartlepool United which finished as a 2–2 draw.

In August 2009, Walsall confirmed that Craddock had chosen to leave professional football and go to study at University full-time. The club retain his registration. After leaving Walsall, Craddock spent time with Halesowen Town before joining Hednesford Town in February 2010. He joined in August 2010 to Non League side Stourbridge F.C. and in July 2012 to Rushall Olympic.

References

External links

Profile at Walsall F.C.
Player Profile at Halesowen Town F.C.

1991 births
Living people
Footballers from Wolverhampton
English footballers
Association football forwards
Walsall F.C. players
Halesowen Town F.C. players
Hednesford Town F.C. players
English Football League players
Rushall Olympic F.C. players
Stourbridge F.C. players
Stafford Rangers F.C.